EpiData is a group of applications used in combination for creating documented data structures and analysis of quantitative data. The EpiData Association, which created the software, was created in 1999 and is based in Denmark. EpiData was developed in Pascal and uses open standards such as HTML where possible.

EpiData is widely used by organizations and individuals to create and analyze large amounts of data. The World Health Organization (WHO) uses EpiData in its STEPS method of collecting epidemiological, medical, and public health data, for biostatistics, and for other quantitative-based projects.

Epicentre, the research wing of Médecins Sans Frontières,  uses EpiData to manage data from its international research studies and field epidemiology studies. E.g.: Piola P, Fogg C et al.: Supervised versus unsupervised intake of six-dose artemether-lumefantrine for treatment of acute, uncomplicated Plasmodium falciparum malaria in Mbarara, Uganda: a randomised trial. Lancet. 2005 Apr 23-29;365(9469):1467-73 ''. Other examples: '', '' or ''.

EpiData has two parts:
 Epidata Entry –  used for simple or programmed data entry and data documentation. It handles simple forms or related systems
 EpiData Analysis – performs basic statistical analysis, graphs, and comprehensive data management, such as recoding data, label values and variables, and basic statistics.  This application can create control charts, such as pareto charts or p-charts, and many other methods to visualize and describe statistical data.

The software is free; development is funded by governmental and non-governmental organizations like WHO.

See also
 Clinical surveillance
 Disease surveillance
 Epidemiological methods
 Control chart

External links
 EpiData official site
 EpiData Wiki
 EpiData-list – mailing list for EpiData
 World Health Organization STEPS approach to surveillance
 Médecins Sans Frontières Epicentre

1999 software
Biostatistics
Epidemiology
Freeware
Statistical software